Gateway IT Park is a proposed information technology (IT) park located in the city of Kandlakoya, Medchal-Malkajgiri district, India.

The building

Infrastructure
Gateway IT Park is a proposed 14-storied building. IT Minister of Telangana, K. T. Rama Rao & Minister of Labour and Employment Ch Malla Reddy laid foundation stone for the facility. Telangana State Industrial Infrastructure Corporation (TSIIC) will build the facility.

See also

 List of tallest buildings in Hyderabad

References

Medchal–Malkajgiri district